Jill McGowan may refer to:

Jill McGowan, fictional character in Village of the Damned (1995 film)
Jill McGowan, see Glasgow City Council election, 2007